Small Time Gangster is an Australian comedy series produced by Boilermaker-Burberry Entertainment for Movie Extra subscription television channel. It also screened on SBS One in 2013.

The series follows the adventures of Tony Piccolo, a man who works hard to support his wife Cathy and two kids. While they think he's cleaning carpets, his real profession is as an underworld enforcer, a brutal standover man.

Cast
 Steve Le Marquand as Tony Piccolo
 Sacha Horler as Cathy Piccolo
 Geoff Morrell as Les
 Gia Carides as Darlene
 Gary Sweet as Barry Donald
 Fletcher Humphrys as Steve
 Jared Daperis as Charlie Donald
 Nicole Gulasekharam as Melanie Piccolo
 Samuel Johnson as Gary
 Sean Rees-Wemyss as Matthew Piccolo
 Kevin Hofbauer as Dean

Season 1 (2011)

See also
 List of Australian television series
 Mr Inbetween

References

External links
 
 Australian Television Information Archive
Boilermaker Pty Ltd

Movie Extra original programming
Australian comedy television series
2011 Australian television series debuts
English-language television shows